was an  which served with the Imperial Japanese Navy (IJN) during World War II.

Background
Yahagi was the third of four vessels completed in the Agano class of light cruisers, which were intended to replace increasingly obsolete light cruisers in the Imperial Japanese Navy. Funding was authorized in the 4th Naval Armaments Supplement Programme of 1939, although construction was delayed due to lack of capacity in Japanese shipyards. Like other vessels of her class, Yahagi was intended for use as the flagship of a destroyer flotilla.

Design
The design for the Agano class was based on technologies developed by the experimental cruiser , resulting in a graceful and uncluttered deck line and single smokestack.

Yahagi was armed with six 152 mm Type 41 guns in three gun turrets. Secondary armament included four 8cm/60 Type 98 naval guns designed specifically for the class, in two twin turrets amidships. Anti-aircraft weapons included two triple 25 mm AA guns in front of the bridge, and two twin 13 mm mounts near the mast. Yahagi also had two quadruple torpedo launchers for Type 93 torpedoes located below the flight deck, with eight reserve torpedoes. The torpedo tubes were mounted on the centerline, as was more common with destroyers, and had a rapid reload system. Being mounted on the centerline allowed the twin launchers to fire to either port or starboard, meaning that a full eight-torpedo broadside could be fired, whereas a ship with separate port and starboard launchers can only fire half of its torpedoes at a time. Two depth charge rails and 18 depth charges were also installed aft. Yahagi was also equipped with two Aichi E13A aircraft and had a flight deck with a 26-foot catapult.

Service career

Early career
Built at Sasebo Naval Arsenal, Yahagi was laid down on 11 November 1941, launched on 25 October 1942 and completed on 29 December 1943. On completion, she was assigned as flagship of Destroyer Squadron 10 of the IJN 3rd Fleet. In February 1944 she was dispatched to Singapore for training and for patrols of the Lingga Islands.

Battles in the Philippines
The Battle of the Philippine Sea began on 19 June 1944. The "First Carrier Striking Force" attacked USN Task Force 58, but suffered overwhelming aircraft losses in what was later nicknamed the "Great Marianas Turkey Shoot".

After dry dock and refitting at Kure Naval Arsenal from late June to early July 1944, Yahagi was fitted with two additional triple-mount Type 96 25 mm AT/AA Gun mounts amidships (bringing its total to 48 barrels) and a Type 13 air-search and a Type 22 surface-search radar set. On 8 July 1944, Yahagi departed Kure with troops, and numerous battleships, cruisers and destroyers and returned to Singapore via Manila.

On 22 October 1944, Yahagi was in the Battle of Leyte Gulf in the Second Section of Force "A" of Vice Admiral Takeo Kurita's First Mobile Striking Force: (Center Force), commanding DesRon 10's DesDiv 2's , DesDiv 4's  and DesDiv 17's Urakaze,  and Isokaze.

Likewise in the Battle off Samar on 25 October 1944, Yahagi fought her way through the battle without damage. On 26 October 1944, Force A was attacked by 80 carrier aircraft off Panay, followed by 30 USAAF B-24 Liberator heavy bombers and an additional 60 carrier-based aircraft. Throughout these attacks Yahagi was not hit and returned to Brunei safely.

End of the Imperial Japanese Navy
On 16 November 1944, DesRon 10 was deactivated and Yahagi was assigned as the flagship of Rear Admiral Keizō Komura's new DesRon 2. Yahagi was ordered back to Japan on the same day for refit, returning safely to Sasebo on 24 November. She remained in Japanese home waters until March 1945.

On 6 April 1945, Yahagi received orders for "Operation Ten-Go", to attack the American invasion force off Okinawa. Yahagi was ordered to accompany Yamato on its final suicide mission against the American fleet. The operation also included the destroyers Isokaze, Hamakaze, Yukikaze,  and Suzutsuki.

At 1220 on 7 April 1945 the Yamato force was attacked by waves of 386 aircraft (180 fighters, 75 bombers, 131 torpedo planes) from Task Force 58. At 12:46, during the first wave, a torpedo hit Yahagi directly in her engine room, killing the entire engineering room crew and bringing her to a complete stop. Dead in the water, Yahagi was hit by at least six more torpedoes and 12 bombs by succeeding waves of air attacks.  Isokaze attempted to come to Yahagis aid but was attacked, heavily damaged, and sank sometime later. Yahagi capsized towards her starboard side, and sank at 14:05 at  taking 445 crewmen with her. Rear Admiral Komura and Captain Tameichi Hara were among the survivors rescued by Hatsushimo and Yukikaze. Her survivors could see Yamato in the distance, still steaming south as U.S. aircraft continued their attacks. However, in reality, Yamato was only minutes away from sinking. Yahagi was removed from the navy list on 20 June 1945.

References

Sources

 — First-hand account of the battle by the captain of the Japanese cruiser Yahagi.

External links
 

Agano-class cruisers
Ships built by Sasebo Naval Arsenal
1942 ships
World War II cruisers of Japan
World War II shipwrecks in the East China Sea
Cruisers sunk by aircraft
Maritime incidents in April 1945
Ships sunk by US aircraft